Alex F. "Wee Alex" Torrance (born c. 1933) is a Scottish curler and coach.

In 1986–1987 he was president of the Royal Caledonian Curling Club (Scottish Curling Association).

Torrance and the entirety of his 1964 Scottish champion rink were farmers from Hamilton.

Teams

Record as a coach of national teams

References

External links
 

Living people
1930s births
Scottish male curlers
Scottish curling champions
Scottish curling coaches
Sportspeople from Hamilton, South Lanarkshire
Scottish farmers